SourcePuller is an open-source client for accessing the BitKeeper version control system. It was originally developed by Andrew Tridgell, who reverse engineered the BitKeeper protocol. While not widely used itself, it is best known for triggering the BitKeeper controversy, which sparked the switch of the Linux kernel from BitKeeper to Git.

References

External links 
 https://sourceforge.net/projects/sourcepuller/

2005 software
Free version control software
Free software programmed in C